The 1st Jussi Awards ceremony, presented by Elokuvajournalistit ry, honored the best Finnish films released between October 1, 1942 and September 30, 1944 and took place on November 16, 1944 at Restaurant Adlon in Helsinki. The Jussi Awards were presented in seven different categories, including Best Director, Best Cinematography, Best Production Design, Best Actor, Best Actress, Best Supporting Actor, and Best Supporting Actress.

Awards

References

Jussi Awards